The Richard Benton House is a historic building located in the West End of Davenport, Iowa, United States. The combination Italianate and Greek Revival house was typical of Davenport's pre-Civil War architecture. The earliest known occupant of the house was Richard Benton who lived here from about 1872 to 1895. Benton owned a livery and stable. Eventually his son Charles joined him in the business. The residence has been listed on the National Register of Historic Places since 1983.

References

Houses completed in 1855
Italianate architecture in Iowa
Greek Revival houses in Iowa
Houses in Davenport, Iowa
Houses on the National Register of Historic Places in Iowa
National Register of Historic Places in Davenport, Iowa